Finland participated at the Eurovision Song Contest 2010 with the song "Työlki ellää" written by Timo Kiiskinen. The song was performed by the duo Kuunkuiskaajat. The Finnish broadcaster Yleisradio (Yle) organised the national final Euroviisut 2010 in order to select the Finnish entry for the 2010 contest in Oslo, Norway. 15 entries were selected to compete in the national final, which consisted of three semi-finals and a final, taking place in January 2010. Ten entries ultimately competed in the final on 30 January where votes from the public selected "Työlki ellää" performed by Kuunkuiskaajat as the winner.

Finland was drawn to compete in the first semi-final of the Eurovision Song Contest which took place on 25 May 2010. Performing during the show in position 5, "Työlki ellää" was not announced among the top 10 entries of the first semi-final and therefore did not qualify to compete in the final. It was later revealed that Finland placed eleventh out of the 17 participating countries in the semi-final with 49 points.

Background 

Prior to the 2010 contest, Finland had participated in the Eurovision Song Contest forty-three times since its first entry in 1961. Finland has won the contest once in 2006 with the song "Hard Rock Hallelujah" performed by Lordi. In the 2009 contest, "Lose Control" performed by Waldo's People managed to qualify Finland to the final but placed last in twenty-fifth.

The Finnish national broadcaster, Yleisradio (Yle), broadcasts the event within Finland and organises the selection process for the nation's entry. Yle confirmed their intentions to participate at the 2010 Eurovision Song Contest on 16 June 2009. Finland's entries for the Eurovision Song Contest have been selected through national final competitions that have varied in format over the years. Since 1961, a selection show that was often titled Euroviisukarsinta highlighted that the purpose of the program was to select a song for Eurovision. Along with their participation confirmation, the broadcaster also announced that the Finnish entry for the 2010 contest would be selected through the Euroviisut selection show.

Before Eurovision

Euroviisut 2010 

Euroviisut 2010 was the national final that selected Finland's entry for the Eurovision Song Contest 2010. The competition consisted of four shows that commenced with the first of three semi-finals on 8 January 2010 and concluded with a final on 30 January 2010. The four shows were hosted by Eurovision Song Contest 2007 host Jaana Pelkonen and YleX DJ Mikko Peltola. All shows were broadcast on Yle TV2 and online at yle.fi. The final was also broadcast via radio on Yle Radio Suomi.

Format 
The format of the competition consisted of four shows: three semi-finals and a final. Five songs competed in each semi-final and the top three entries from each semi-final as well as a wildcard act selected by a jury from the remaining non-qualifying entries qualified to complete the ten-song lineup in the final. The results for the semi-finals and the final were determined exclusively by a public vote. Public voting included the options of telephone and SMS voting.

Competing entries
Twelve artists, including the winner of the Finnish tango contest Tangomarkkinat in 2009, Amadeus Lundberg, were directly invited by Yle to compete in the national final following consultation with record companies and presented on 30 September 2009. A submission period was also opened by Yle which lasted between 16 June 2009 and 31 August 2009. At least one of the writers and the lead singer(s) had to hold Finnish citizenship or live in Finland permanently in order for the entry to qualify to compete. A panel of experts appointed by Yle selected thirty entries for an online selection from the 267 received submissions. The competing entries were released on 1 October 2009 at yle.fi/euroviisut and the public was able to vote through SMS until 16 October 2009. Among the artists competing in the online selection was former Finnish Eurovision entrant Geir Rönning who represented Finland in 2005. The top three from the thirty entries qualified to the national final and were announced during a televised programme on 16 October 2009.

Shows

Semi-finals
The three semi-final shows took place on 8, 15 and 22 January 2010 at the Tohloppi Studios in Tampere. The top three from the five competing entries in each semi-final qualified to the final based on the results from the public vote. "Sydän ymmärtää" performed by Maria Lund was awarded the jury wildcard and also qualified to the final.

Final
The final took place on 30 January 2010 at the Tampere Exhibition and Sports Centre in Tampere where the ten entries that qualified from the preceding three semi-finals competed. The winner was selected over two rounds of public televoting. In the first round, the top three from the ten competing entries qualified to the second round, the superfinal. In the superfinal, "Työlki ellää" performed by Kuunkuiskaajat was selected as the winner. A total of 233,683 votes were cast during the show: 119,142 in the final and 114,541 in the superfinal. In addition to the performances of the competing entries, the interval act featured Mikko Leppilampi and Norwegian Eurovision Song Contest 2009 winner Alexander Rybak.

Ratings

Promotion 
Kuunkuiskaajat specifically promoted "Työlki ellää" as the Finnish Eurovision entry on 24 April 2010 by performing during the Eurovision in Concert event which was held at the Lexion venue in Zaanstad, Netherlands on 24 April and hosted by Cornald Maas and Marga Bult.

At Eurovision

According to Eurovision rules, all nations with the exceptions of the host country and the "Big Four" (France, Germany, Spain and the United Kingdom) were required to qualify from one of two semi-finals in order to compete for the final; the top ten countries from each semi-final progress to the final. The European Broadcasting Union (EBU) split up the competing countries into six different pots based on voting patterns from previous contests, with countries with favourable voting histories put into the same pot. On 7 February 2010, a special allocation draw was held which placed each country into one of the two semi-finals, as well as which half of the show they would perform in. Finland was placed into the first semi-final, to be held on 25 May 2010, and was scheduled to perform in the first half of the show. The running order for the semi-finals was decided through another draw on 23 March 2010 and Finland was set to perform in position 5, following the entry from Slovakia and before the entry from Latvia.

The two semi-finals and the final were televised in Finland on Yle TV2 with commentary in Finnish by Jaana Pelkonen and Asko Murtomäki. The three shows were also broadcast on Yle FST5 with commentary in Swedish by Thomas Larsson as well as via radio with Finnish commentary by Sanna Pirkkalainen and Jorma Hietamäki on Yle Radio Suomi. The Finnish spokesperson, who announced the Finnish votes during the final, was Johanna Pirttilahti.

Semi-final 
Kuunkuiskaajat took part in technical rehearsals on 16 and 20 May, followed by dress rehearsals on 24 and 25 May. This included the jury show on 24 May where the professional juries of each country watched and voted on the competing entries.

The Finnish performance featured the members of Kuunkuiskaajat performing in white dresses joined by two dancers/backing vocalists and a violinist wearing beige outfits. Member Susan Aho also played the accordion with an illuminated stone in front of her. Kuunkuiskaajat and the backing performers performed a dance routine together on stage which were in blue and white colours. The performance also featured the use of a wind machine. The two dancers/backing vocalists that joined Kuunkuiskaajat on stage were Aki Eronen and Jukka Tarvainen, while the violinist was Maria Baric.

At the end of the show, Finland was not announced among the top 10 entries in the first semi-final and therefore failed to qualify to compete in the final. It was later revealed that Finland placed eleventh in the semi-final, receiving a total of 49 points.

Voting 
Voting during the three shows consisted of 50 percent public televoting and 50 percent from a jury deliberation. The jury consisted of five music industry professionals who were citizens of the country they represent. This jury was asked to judge each contestant based on: vocal capacity; the stage performance; the song's composition and originality; and the overall impression by the act. In addition, no member of a national jury could be related in any way to any of the competing acts in such a way that they cannot vote impartially and independently.

Following the release of the full split voting by the EBU after the conclusion of the competition, it was revealed that Finland had placed sixth with the public televote and fifteenth with the jury vote in the first semi-final. In the public vote, Finland scored 69 points, while with the jury vote, Finland scored 37 points.

Below is a breakdown of points awarded to Finland and awarded by Finland in the first semi-final and grand final of the contest. The nation awarded its 12 points to Estonia in the semi-final and to Germany in the final of the contest.

Points awarded to Finland

Points awarded by Finland

References

External links
  Yle Euroviisut website* 
  Full national final on Yle Elävä Arkisto

2010
Countries in the Eurovision Song Contest 2010
Eurovision
Eurovision